Lime Canyon Wilderness is a unit of the National Wilderness Preservation System located in eastern Nevada, United States, within the Gold Butte National Monument. The  wilderness area is administered by the Bureau of Land Management, and was designated in 2002 to protect roadless, undeveloped mountains bordering Lake Mead National Recreation Area.

References

Wilderness areas of Nevada
Units of the National Landscape Conservation System